The Leavenworth Echo is a weekly newspaper in Leavenworth, Washington, United States. It was founded in 1904.

History

The Echo was founded by Deed H. Mayar and published its first edition on January 15, 1904. It was preceded by a now-defunct newspaper, the Journal, which began publication in 1898. The newspaper leaned Republican and was published from Mayar's home in a five-column format. Mayar was later elected as the first mayor of Leavenworth when the town was incorporated in 1906. The newspaper's editors during this period were Deed and his son Julian, who later enlisted in the U.S. Navy during World War I.

Mayar retired in 1919 and sold the newspaper to the Echo Publishing Company. NCW Media Inc. purchased the Echo and Cashmere Valley Record from the Echo Publication Company in 2000.

References

Chelan County, Washington
Newspapers published in Washington (state)